The Case of the Thorns (1466) YB 6 Ed 4, 7a pl 18 is an important historical court case from the King's Bench in common law torts. The English case, which occurred in the 15th century, is the earliest record of a common law court basing its decision on the now fundamental principle of torts: That if an individual suffers (civil) damages at the hand of another, that individual has a right to be compensated.

The case, technically  cited as Hulle v. Orynge 1466. Y.B.M. 6 Edw. IV, folio 7, placitum 18., is still widely used in American law schools in introductory tort classes.

Background
The defendant owned a 1-acre farm adjoining the plaintiff's 5 acres, which were separated by a hedge of thorn bush. The defendant was trying to retrieve thorns from a dividing hedge which had fallen onto the Plaintiff’s property. In retrieving the thorns the defendant had damaged some of the plaintiffs crops; specifically he “trampled and damaged" the crops. The issue was whether the defendant was liable for trespass.

Rule
Although the decision was divided, the majority held that if a person damages another's property there is a tort even if the action that brought such damages was itself lawful. As Pigot, J states, "And so if a man has a fish-pond in his manor and he empties the water out of the pond to take the fishes and the water floods my land, I shall have a good action, and yet the act was lawful."

One who voluntarily does an act which results in damages to another is responsible for the damages even if the act was lawful.

Report
This case excerpt was summarised in Bessy v Olliot & Lambert (1681) as follows.

See also
Trespass
English tort law

References

1460s in law
English tort case law
English property case law
1466 in England